Pamela Keevilkral (born 14 May 1955) is a British  actress who did voice work for the animated series The Animals of Farthing Wood from 1992 to 1995. She also played Debbie in the comedy TV film Incident on The Line. She was also the narrator for The Essential Lover's Guide. She is sometimes credited as Pamela Keevil or Pamela Keevil-Kral.

Pamela Keevil taught Drama at Bishop Wand Church of England Sports College School for a short period of time.

External links 
 

1955 births
Living people
20th-century British actresses
21st-century British actresses
British television actresses
British voice actresses
People from Camberwell